Vida is the eighteenth  studio album by La Mafia.  It was released on April 23, 1994. The album reach the number two spot and stayed there for forty-seven weeks on the Billboard Latin Pop chart. "Vida" and "Me Duele Estar Solo" reached the number one spot. Vida was nominated for a Lo Nuestro Award for Pop Album of the Year at the 7th Lo Nuestro Awards.

Track listing

Chart position

References

1994 albums
La Mafia albums
Spanish-language albums